Maximovka is a rural locality (a khutor) in Savinskoye Rural Settlement, Pallasovsky District, Volgograd Oblast, Russia. The population was 66 as of 2010. There are 4 streets.

Geography 
Maximovka is located on the right bank of the Torgun River, 35 km northeast of Pallasovka (the district's administrative centre) by road. Kumysolechebnitsa is the nearest rural locality.

References 

Rural localities in Pallasovsky District